State Highway Spur 421 (Spur 421) is a state highway spur in the San Antonio, Texas, USA metropolitan area.

Route description
Spur 421 begins at an intersection with I-10 north of Downtown San Antonio. The route follows Culebra Road to the west before turning to the northwest along Bandera Road. The designation ends at Loop 410 and SH 16; southbound SH 16 follows the Loop 410 freeway, while northbound SH 16 continues along Bandera Road.

History
Spur 421 is a former route of SH 16, and was designated (along with Spur 422) on November 16, 1965, after SH 16 was rerouted around the west side of San Antonio along the Loop 410 freeway. The section of Spur 421 south of Callaghan Road was proposed for decommissioning in 2014 (Spur 421 would have also replaced the section of SH 16 north to Eckhert Road as well) as part of TxDOT's San Antonio turnback proposal, which would have turned back over 129 miles of roads to the city of San Antonio, but the city of San Antonio rejected that proposal.

Major intersections

See also
List of highways in San Antonio, Texas
List of state highway spurs in Texas

References

421
Transportation in Bexar County, Texas